Aidin Bozorgi (1989– disappeared July 20, 2013 in Broad Peak, Pakistan) was an Iranian mountain climber. He was 13 years old when he started mountaineering. Soon, he had shown how talented he was by climbing Mount Damavand when he was only 15 years old. Bozorgi was good at most mountain-relating climbing sports such as ice climbing, mixed climbing, rock climbing, sport climbing, big wall climbing, traditional climbing, aid climbing and bouldering.

Biography
Bozorgi had grown up in Tehran, Iran. His achievements were in variety of fields like painting, kung-fu and mountaineering. Hasan Najjarian was his motivator into the world of mountaineering. Being his trainee for couple of years, he was accepted in K.N.Toosi University of Technology and continued his mountaineering life with the university mountaineering group. In order to be a professional mountaineer, he joined Arash alpine club in 2007.

Bozorgi got third place in Khwarizmi competition 2005. He was educated in Tehran, receiving a bachelor's degree in electrical engineering at K.N.Toosi University of Technology 2013. He was ranked 5th in 18th national Economics Olympiad. He also ranked 11th in the national master's degree exam in Economics 2013.

Setting Iran route
Bozorgi (with Pouya Keivan and Mojtaba Jarahi) successfully completed a new route on the Southwest Face of Broad Peak they had been working on since 2009. The descent proved to be more complicated than expected. Climber Thomas Laemmle, who helped with the unsuccessful search and rescue attempt, stated that he believed Bozorgi and his companions were dead, and the search operation on Broad Peak was formally called off. They have been presumed dead.

Climbed mountaineering routes

2008 
 Chalun (4550m), (winter ascends), Arash club team
 Siah Sangha (4604m), (winter ascends), Arash club team
 Siah Kaman (4472m), (winter ascends), Arash club team

2009 
 Shah Alborz (4170m), (winter ascends)

2009/11 
 Broad Peak (8051m), Iran route, 2 attempts, Arash club team

2009/10/11 
 6 ascends on Sabalan (4811m), north face glacier

2010 
 Damavand (5610m), north ridge (winter ascend)
 Harze Kuh divide (autumn ascends)
 Dena divide (autumn ascends)
 Sabalan ranges, Kasra peak (4420m), west glacier

2010/11 
 Damavand (5610m), south ridge (winter ascends)
 Kolun Bastak to Sarakchal divide (winter ascends)
 Damavand (5610m), Yakhar glacier
 Damavand (5610m), Sioole glacier

2011/13 
 Azad Kuh (4395m), (winter ascends)

2012 
 Damavand (5610m), Daagh ridge (winter ascend)
 Zard Kuh divide
 Sabalan ranges, Heram II peak (4450m), west glacier

2013 
 Divide of Pasande Kuh to north Khersan (1st winter ascend), with Pouya Keivan
 Broad Peak (8051m), Iran route, 1st ascend, without supplemental oxygen, Arash club team

Climbed big wall climbing routes

Alam-Kuh (4850m)

2010 

 Polish 1973 route (52 Lahestaniha)
 German's arête (Gorde Almanha)

2012 
 Arash (Solo climbing)
 Karajiha-Polish 1969 (48 Lahestaniha)

Bisotun

2010 
 Gharargah

2011 

 Harry Rost

2013 
 Jashnvare (Route setter)

Pol-e Khvab 
 Roja
 Negar (2 pitches)
 NTM (3 pitches)
 Chakosh (3 pitches)
 Marmoolak
 Gigilikh
 Omid
 Brono
 Sisakht (2 pitches)
 Arezu (3 pitches)
 Flash Tank
 Shirin
 Doustet Daram
 H
 Abroftiha (2 pitches)
 Kolahak Salaam
 Darz-e shirin
 Zire Baran
 Parastu

Caving 

 Paroo
 Ghalay Chay
 Namaki

See also
List of people who disappeared

References

1989 births
2010s missing person cases
Iranian mountain climbers
Missing person cases in Pakistan
Sportspeople from Tehran
Possibly living people